Thaspiviridae is a family of spindle-shaped viruses that is not assigned to any higher taxonomic ranks. The family contains a single genus, Nitmarvirus, which contains a single species, Nitmarvirus NSV1.

Members of the family Thaspiviridae have linear dsDNA genomes of 27 to 29 kbp and are the first viruses known to infect mesophilic ammonia-oxidizing archaea of the phylum Thaumarchaeota. The virion of Nitrosopumilus spindle-shaped virus 1 (NSV1) is 64±3 nm in diameter and 112±6 nm in length with a short tail at one pole. The spindle-shape morphology of the virion is very similar to those of members of the families Fuselloviridae and Halspiviridae, which infect hyperthermophilic and hyperhalophilic archaea, respectively.

References

Virus families